Divine Word University is a national Catholic university in Papua New Guinea. It is one of the newest tertiary institutions in the country. It was established as a university by an Act of Parliament in 1996. The university is ecumenical and coeducational, and is under the leadership of the Divine Word Missionaries.

History
Its first educational institution was Divine Word Secondary High School. In 1980, this became Divine Word Institute, established by an Act of Parliament.

It is based in Madang on the north coast of Papua New Guinea. On-site accommodation is available in DWU as well as day attendance for local students.

Divine Word University has five faculties. These are Arts, Business and Informatics, Education, Health Sciences, and Theology. In 2012 the former Faculty of Flexible Learning was changed into the Flexible Learning Centre and each of its constituent departments migrated to one of the other faculties for administrative purposes. The University offers undergraduate degrees as well as Masters programs in most faculties, and the PhD. Masters and PhD programs can be done on a full-time basis or off campus in distance mode by occasional attendance and work completion.

The university is amalgamating and affiliating with a number of institutions to provide a broader base of education. In April 2002, the College of Allied Health Sciences (Madang) amalgamated and St. Benedict's Teachers College in Wewak, East Sepik Province joined in August 2003. These institutions are now campuses of DWU. In 2013, the university joined in operating Tabubil Hospital in Tabubil, Western Province.

In 2016, the university appointed Cecilia Nembou as president and vice-chancellor, the first woman to hold the position of vice-chancellor at a university in Papua New Guinea.

Affiliations
 The Catholic Higher Education Association (PNG)
 The Asia-Pacific Conference of SVD-administered Universities

Notable people
 John Z'graggen (former faculty member)

References

About DWU

External links
University homepage

Universities in Papua New Guinea
Madang Province
Nondenominational Christian universities and colleges
Religious organisations based in Papua New Guinea
Catholic Church in Papua New Guinea
Educational institutions established in 1980
Divine Word Missionaries Order